Michel Rey (born 3 February 1932) is a Swiss cross-country skier. He competed in the men's 15 kilometre event at the 1956 Winter Olympics.

References

External links
 

1932 births
Living people
Swiss male cross-country skiers
Olympic cross-country skiers of Switzerland
Cross-country skiers at the 1956 Winter Olympics
Sportspeople from the canton of Fribourg